The Committee for State Security of the Byelorussian Soviet Socialist Republic (KGB of the BSSR;) was the main state security organization in the Byelorussian Soviet Socialist Republic. It was a branch of the Committee for State Security of USSR.

History

In the early 20th century, the Russian Cheka led by Felix Dzherzhinsky began operating on Belarusian land. On 1 March 1922, under the auspices, Central Executive Committee of the BSSR, a State Political Directorate is formed.  The People's Commissariat for Internal Affairs (NKVD), the KGB's predecessor agency, was in the mid-1950s involve in mant Stalinist purges around the country, especially on Belarus. In March 1954, the central government in Moscow began reforms for the Soviet Interior Ministry, during which the Committee for State Security (KGB), was a subordinate agency under Council of Ministers of the Soviet Union. On 19 May 1954, the Soviet government in Belarus made the decision to form a republican affiliate of the KGB, led by Alexander Perepelitsyn. In December 1978, the KGB of the BSSR became an independent institution of the national agency, having responsibility for all assets in Belarus. In September 1991, the Supreme Soviet of Belarus renamed the KGB of the BSSR to the KGB of the Republic of Belarus, which became the new national security body of the state. A month earlier, the Declaration of State Sovereignty of the Byelorussian Soviet Socialist Republic signed, effectively declaring Belarus an independent state from the USSR.

Chairmen 

Chairmen of Cheka of BSSR

 Viktor Yarkin (1918–1920)
 Aleksandr Rotenberg (1920–1921)

Chairmen of GPU under the Government of BSSR

 Jan Olski (1921–1923)
 Stanisław Pintal (1923–1924)
 Filipp Medved (1924–1925)
 Roman Pillyar (1925–1929)
 Grigoriy Rappoport (1929–1931)
 Stanislav Redens (1931)
 German Matson (1931–1932)
 Leonid Zakovsky (1932–1934)

People's Commissars of Internal Affairs of BSSR

 Leonid Zakovsky (1934)
 Izrail Leplevsky (1934–1936)
 Grigory Molchanov (1936—1937)
 Boris Davydovych Berman (1937–1938)
 Aleksei Nasedkin (1938)
 Lavrentiy Tsanava (1938–1946)

Ministers of State Security of BSSR
 Lavrentiy Tsanava (1946–1951)
 Mikhail Baskakov (1951–1954)

Chairmen of the KGB under the Council of Ministers of BSSR
 Alexander Perepelitsyn - April 6, 1954 – August 31, 1959 
 Vasily Petrov - October 13, 1959 – August 10, 1970 
 Yakov Nikulkin - June 23, 1970 – August 4, 1980 
 Veniamin Baluev - August 4, 1980 – November 24, 1990 
 Eduard Shirkovsky - November 16, 1990 – September 1991

See also
 Soviet repression in Belarus
 KGB (Belarus)

References 

Byelorussian Soviet Socialist Republic
KGB
Political repression in the Soviet Union